The women's 200 metres event at the 1965 Summer Universiade was held at the People's Stadium in Budapest on 27 and 28 August 1965.

Medalists

Results

Semifinals

Final

Wind: +1.3 m/s

References

Athletics at the 1965 Summer Universiade
1965